The women's club throw at the 2017 World Para Athletics Championships was held at the Olympic Stadium in London from 14 to 23 July.

Medalists

See also
List of IPC world records in athletics

References

club throw
2017 in women's athletics
Club throw at the World Para Athletics Championships
Women's sport in London